Senator Yancey may refer to:

Bartlett Yancey (1785–1828), North Carolina State Senate
Benjamin Cudworth Yancey Jr. (1817–1891), Alabama State Senate
Lee Yancey (born 1968), Mississippi State Senate